Upper Tākaka is a settlement in the Tasman District of New Zealand.

Located near the head of the Tākaka valley, Upper Tākaka is on State Highway 60, at the western end of the Tākaka Hill road. The settlement is home to a major electrical substation, upgraded by lines company Network Tasman in 2016, consisting of the installation of new 66/11 kV transformers, at a cost of $1.95 million. The area suffered a decline from 1987, first with the closure of Upper Takaka School, and then a fire that razed the Rat Trap Hotel. The local hall is now the centre of community life in Upper Tākaka.

References

Populated places in the Tasman District